"You Didn't" is a song co-written and recorded by American country music singer Brett Young. It was released on November 15, 2021, as the third single from his third studio album Weekends Look a Little Different These Days.

Content
Young wrote the song with Ashley Gorley, Jon Nite, and Jimmy Robbins during a songwriting session. The four wanted to write a song about a breakup but found it difficult as all four of them are in relationships. However, at the songwriting session, Young recalled that before marrying his wife, Taylor, he had previously broken up with her. Taylor also appears in the song's corresponding music video.

Charts

References

2021 songs
2021 singles
Brett Young (singer) songs
Songs written by Brett Young (singer)
Songs written by Ashley Gorley
Songs written by Jon Nite
Songs written by Jimmy Robbins
Song recordings produced by Dann Huff
Big Machine Records singles